Cybaeopsis wabritaska is a species of hacklemesh weaver in the spider family Amaurobiidae. It is found in the United States and Canada.

References

Amaurobiidae
Articles created by Qbugbot
Spiders described in 1972